Rhys Frake-Waterfield is a British film director, screenwriter, producer and editor, who became known for his 2023 independent horror film Winnie-the-Pooh: Blood and Honey. It was the first theatrical film of his career, as well as the first for his production company, Jagged Edge Productions.

Early life
From 2009 to 2013, Frake-Waterfield attended University of Essex, where he earned a degree in science and economics. In 2021, he left his job at EDF Energy to begin producing films at Jagged Edge Productions.

Career
After leaving EDF Energy, Frake-Waterfield produced between 40 and 50 feature films in the span of two years.

On January 1, 2022, the 1926 Winnie-the-Pooh book entered the public domain. Shortly after this, Jagged Edge Productions announced a Winnie-the-Pooh-based slasher film called Winnie-the-Pooh: Blood and Honey, with Frake-Waterfield serving as the director, writer, and co-producer with Scott Jeffrey. There was much controversy among both the general public and Winnie-the-Pooh fan community, with Frake-Waterfield claiming he and the other members on the film's production received death threats, but the film was released in theatres in the United States on February 15, 2023, receiving very poor reviews. The film made over $3.6 million on a budget reported to be less than $100,000. Afterwards, Frake-Waterfield announced a sequel to Blood and Honey with a budget five times greater, along with horror films based on Bambi and Peter Pan. He also expressed interest in making films about Thor, the Teletubbies, and the Teenage Mutant Ninja Turtles in the future.

Selected filmography

Producer only

References

External links
 

British film directors
British film producers
Alumni of the University of Essex
Year of birth missing (living people)
Living people